The Croton River is a river in southern New York with three principal tributaries: the West Branch, Middle Branch, and East Branch.  Their waters, all part of the New York City water supply system, join downstream from the Croton Falls Reservoir. Together, their waters and the reservoirs linked to them represent the northern half of the New York City water system's Croton Watershed.

Shortly after the confluence of the three Croton River branches the Croton River proper, along with its tributary, the Muscoot River, flows into the Muscoot Reservoir, after which it empties into the New Croton Reservoir, which feeds the New Croton Aqueduct supplying water to New York City.

History

The Croton River was the main source of the city water supply from 1842 to the mid-20th century. Water was brought to the city through the Croton Aqueduct, later called the Old Croton Aqueduct. The larger New Croton Aqueduct opened in 1890. The Old Croton Aqueduct remained in service until 1955.

Seeking to expand the city's water supply, engineers of the city Aqueduct Commission designed in 1884 a  masonry dam spanning the Croton River near its mouth. The resulting storage reservoir, impounding a  watershed, would hold  at full capacity. This dam, now known as the New Croton Dam, was completed in 1906. Further upstream, two tributaries of the Croton were dammed, creating the Croton Falls Reservoir, which was placed into service in 1911.

In the 1890s, rather than building an expensive filtration system, the city ordered the destruction or relocation of any village or hamlet in the watershed that was considered to be a potential pollution source for the Croton or its tributaries. Many were moved.

In the late 1990s, the city stopped using water from the Croton system as it became more and more unsuitable for drinking. In 2004, a project was started to rehabilitate the New Croton Aqueduct and build the Croton Water Filtration Plant, which came online in May 2015. By the early 21st century the Croton system was supplying 10% of the city's water.

See also
Water supply network
List of rivers of New York
Croton Gorge Park

Notes

References

Rivers of Westchester County, New York
Tributaries of the Hudson River
Croton Watershed
Rivers of New York (state)